Ryad Mezzour (born 1971) is the Moroccan Minister of Industry and Trade. He was appointed as minister on 7 October 2021.

Education 
Mezzour received his baccalaureate (1989) from the Lycée Lyautey. He holds a Bachelor in Mechanical Engineering (1996)  and a Master in Business Management (2000) from the Swiss Federal Institute of Technology.

References 

1971 births
21st-century Moroccan politicians
ETH Zurich alumni
Government ministers of Morocco
Living people
Moroccan politicians